Grottoes is an incorporated town in Augusta and Rockingham counties in the U.S. state of Virginia. The population was 2,668 at the 2010 census.

The Rockingham County portion of Grottoes is part of the Harrisonburg Metropolitan Statistical Area, while the small portion that extends into Augusta County is part of the Staunton–Waynesboro Micropolitan Statistical Area.  Only seven of the town's 2,668 residents reside in Augusta County.

Grottoes is home to the Grand Caverns, America's oldest show cave.

History
The town was incorporated in 1892 under the name Shendun.  In 1912 the name was changed to Grottoes. ("Grottoes" means caves).
The Stephen Harnsberger House was listed on the National Register of Historic Places in 1982.

Geography
Grottoes is located at  (38.267385, −78.824868).

According to the United States Census Bureau, the town has a total area of 1.3 square miles (3.4 km2), all land.

Transportation
The main highways providing access to Grottoes are U.S. Route 340 and Virginia State Route 256. US 340 provides north–south access, connecting to Interstate 64 near Waynesboro and U.S. Route 33 near Elkton. SR 256 provides access to and from the west, connecting to Interstate 81 near Weyers Cave.

Demographics

As of the census of 2000, there were 2,114 people, 861 households, and 593 families living in the town. The population density was 1,590.4 people per square mile (613.7/km2). There were 894 housing units at an average density of 672.6 per square mile (259.5/km2). The racial makeup of the town was 94.94% White, 3.78% African American, 0.19% Native American, 0.24% Asian, 0.09% from other races, and 0.76% from two or more races. Hispanic or Latino of any race were 1.51% of the population.

There were 861 households, out of which 36.2% had children under the age of 18 living with them, 53.2% were married couples living together, 11.4% had a female householder with no husband present, and 31.1% were non-families. 27.2% of all households were made up of individuals, and 11.7% had someone living alone who was 65 years of age or older. The average household size was 2.46 and the average family size was 2.98.

In the town, the population was spread out, with 27.0% under the age of 18, 7.5% from 18 to 24, 34.0% from 25 to 44, 20.5% from 45 to 64, and 10.9% who were 65 years of age or older. The median age was 34 years. For every 100 females there were 89.8 males. For every 100 females age 18 and over, there were 84.8 males.

The median income for a household in the town was $38,618, and the median income for a family was $46,574. Males had a median income of $32,500 versus $25,500 for females. The per capita income for the town was $17,195. About 5.5% of families and 7.2% of the population were below the poverty line, including 6.0% of those under age 18 and 14.2% of those age 65 or over.

Notable people
Daryl Irvine – former relief pitcher for the Boston Red Sox
Dell Curry – former NBA player for the Charlotte Hornets

References

External links

 Town website

Towns in Augusta County, Virginia
Towns in Rockingham County, Virginia
Populated places established in 1892
1892 establishments in Virginia